The 2018 United States Senate election in Massachusetts took place on November 6, 2018. Incumbent Democratic U.S. Senator Elizabeth Warren ran for re-election to a second term. The candidate filing deadline was June 5, 2018, and the primary election was held on September 4, 2018.

Warren won re-election, defeating her Republican opponent, Geoff Diehl.

Democratic primary

Candidates

Nominated
 Elizabeth Warren, incumbent U.S. Senator

Results

Republican primary

Candidates

Nominated
 Geoff Diehl, state representative

Eliminated in primary
 Beth Lindstrom, former Undersecretary of the Massachusetts Office of Consumer Affairs and Business Regulation
 John Kingston, attorney and founder and president of Better for America

Eliminated at convention
 Darius Mitchell
 Heidi Wellman

Declined
 Gabriel Gomez, businessman, former Navy SEAL and nominee for the U.S. Senate in 2013
 Rick Green, businessman (running for House of Representatives) 
 Curt Schilling, former Major League Baseball pitcher
 Bill Weld, former governor, nominee for the U.S. Senate in 1996 and Libertarian nominee for Vice President of the United States in 2016 (endorsed Beth Lindstrom)
 Daniel Winslow, former state representative and candidate for the U.S. Senate in 2013

Endorsements

Polling

Results

Overall

By county

Results by county. Red represents counties won by Diehl. Teal represents counties won by Kingston.

Libertarian primary

Candidates

Declined
 Bill Weld, former Republican Governor and nominee for Vice President of the United States in 2016

Independents

Candidates

Declared
 Shiva Ayyadurai, entrepreneur and conspiracy theorist
 Allen Waters
 John Devine

Declined 
 Gabriel Gomez, businessman, former Navy SEAL and Republican nominee for the U.S. Senate in 2013

General election

Endorsements

Debates
Complete video of debate, October 19, 2018
Complete video of debate, October 21, 2018

Predictions 

^Highest rating they assert

Polling

with Beth Lindstrom

with John Kingston

with Shiva Ayyadurai running as Republican

with Curt Schilling

with William Weld

Results

By congressional district
Warren won all of the state’s congressional districts.

References

External links
Candidates at Vote Smart
Candidates at Ballotpedia
Campaign finance at FEC
Campaign finance at OpenSecrets

Official campaign websites
Shiva Ayyadurai (I) for Senate
Geoff Diehl (R) for Senate
Elizabeth Warren (D) for Senate
Allen Waters (I) for Senate

2018
Massachusetts
United States Senate
Elizabeth Warren